Chris Draper (born 20 March 1978) is a British sailor who has won multiple World and European championships and a bronze medal at the Sailing at the 2004 Olympic competing in the mixed 49er.
He has been a winner of the Extreme Sailing Series and was helmsman for Luna Rossa, Italy's America's cup challenger 2011 to 2015. In the 34th Americas cup he became the first Britain to helm in the Louis Vuitton cup final.
For the ACWS & 35th America's Cup between 2015 and the Cup event in Bermuda in June 2017 he held the position of Sailing Team Manager / Tactician and Wing trimmer for Softbank Team Japan. In 2019 he became CEO and Wing trimmer for the Great Britain team racing in the newly formed SailGP, racing the F50 hydro foiling catamarans in a global racing circuit. In 2021 he joined the Japanese SailGP team as a Wing Trimmer. winning multiple events during the 2021/2022 SailGP season and finishing runners up overall. 

His current home town is Lytchett Matravers, Dorset, UK. He is married, with two children. He started sailing aged 7 in an Optimist and describes his father and Jim Saltonstall (former RYA Youth Program Leader and Coach) as the key to his current career. Other interests outside of sailing include Surfing and Mountain biking.

Sailing career

2022
Wing Trimmer for the Canadian SailGP team

2021
Wing Trimmer for the Japan SailGP team. The team won events in the Italian and French legs of the world circuit finishing overall runners up for the season

2019
CEO and Wing Trimmer for the Great Britain SailGP team

2017
Tactician and Wing trimmer on Softbank Team Japan America's Cup catamaran for 35th AC in Bermuda.
In semi final for Challenger selection.

2016
ACWS Softbank Team Japan

2015
Helm for Luna Rossa until team withdrew from 35th Americas Cup
Joined Softbank Team Japan as Sailing Team Manager, Tactician and Wing Trimmer for ACWS

2014
Helm for Luna Rossa

2013
America's cup, on Luna Rossa 72' AC Catamaran. Louis Vuitton Cup finalist, Helmsman
2nd Overall Americas Cup World Series 2012 - 2013

2012
He won, on Luna Rossa Piranha, the first ACWS fleet racing event in Naples. 2nd Place ACWS match racing in Venice. Winner ACWS Fleet racing and 3rd place match racing ACWS Newport. Second Place ACWS fleet racing San Francisco.

2011
He was a member of the Team Korea America Cup challenge helming all the events in the AC45 World Series in 2011 before leaving the team. The team were in a highly creditable 4th place at the time.

2010
49er World Championships - 6th
49er European Championships – 1st Gold Medal
Princess Sophia Trophy – 2nd Silver medal 49er

2009
49er World Championships - 6th
Extreme Sailing Series (then the iShares Cup) (Helm) - 1st

2008
Extreme Sailing Series (then the iShares Cup) (Helm) - 4th

2007
49er World Championships - 9th
Semaine Olympique Francaise - 1st 49er

2006
49er World Championships – 1st Gold Medal
49er Olympic test event – 1st Gold Medal
Mumm 30 World Championship - 3rd
Mumm 30 Spi Ouest - 1st

2004
Olympic Regatta, Athens – Bronze Medal 49er
49er European Championship – 1st Gold Medal
49er World Championship – 2nd Silver Medal

2003
ISAF Sailing World Championships – 1st Gold Medal 49er
49er European Championship – 2nd Silver Medal
Kiel Week Regatta, Germany – 1st Gold Medal 49er
SPA Olympic Class Regatta, Holland – 1st Gold Medal 49er
Olympic Class Week, Barcelona – 1st Gold Medal 49er
Cadiz Test Event – 2nd Silver Medal 49er

2002
Olympic Test Event 2002 – 3rd Bronze Medal 49er
49er European Championship – 2nd Silver Medal
49er World Championship – 2nd Silver Medal

1996
ISAF Youth Sailing World Championships – 420 Silver Medal

References

External links
 
 

Living people
Olympic sailors of Great Britain
British male sailors (sport)
Olympic bronze medallists for Great Britain
Sailors at the 2004 Summer Olympics – 49er
Olympic medalists in sailing
Team Korea sailors
1978 births
Luna Rossa Challenge sailors
Medalists at the 2004 Summer Olympics
Extreme Sailing Series sailors
49er class world champions
2017 America's Cup sailors
2013 America's Cup sailors
World champions in sailing for Great Britain